Gryszkiewicz is a surname. Notable people with this surname include:

 Adrian Gryszkiewicz (born 1999), Polish footballer
 Piotr Gryszkiewicz (born 2001), Polish footballer

See also
 

Polish-language surnames